The Christmas Album is a bootleg album featuring the band Stiff Little Fingers, released in 1979 (see 1979 in music), although later released as an official live album as Live in Sweden 1991 (see 1991 in music).

Track listing
"Alternative Ulster [live]" (Burns, Ogilvie) – 3:19
"Straw Dogs" (Burns, Ogilvie)
"Barbed Wire Love" (Stiff Little Fingers, Ogilvie)
"Wait and See" (Stiff Little Fingers)
"No More of That" (Stiff Little Fingers)
"Tin Soldiers" (Burns, Ogilvie) – 4:42
"Gotta Gettaway" (Burns, Ogilvie)
"No Change" (Stiff Little Fingers)
"State of Emergency" (Stiff Little Fingers)
"Nobody's Hero" (Stiff Little Fingers)
"Breakout" (Stiff Little Fingers)
"Wasted Life" (Burns) – 2:58
"Alternative Ulster" (Burns, Ogilvie) – 3:19
"Suspect Device" (Ogilvie, Stiff Little Fingers) – 2:30
"At the Edge [live]" (Burns) – 3:03

Personnel
Jake Burns - vocals, guitar
Henry Cluney - guitar, vocals
Ali McMordie - bass guitar, vocals
Jim Reilly - drums

1991 live albums
Bootleg recordings
Stiff Little Fingers live albums